USS Nottoway may refer to the following ships operated by the United States Navy:

, a district harbor tugboat, which bore the name Nottoway for a time
, a  launched in 1944 and struck in 1962

United States Navy ship names